Ahmadpur Sial, is a city in Jhang District in the Punjab province of Pakistan. The city is the headquarters of Ahmadpur Sial Tehsil with a tehsil population of 433,517.

History 
The Ahmadpur and Garh Mahraja domains were added to the possessions of the Rajbana Sial tribe who had driven out the Baloch to the Thal and defeated the Nawab of Multan by the late 1700s under its tribal chief, Mahr Rajab Khan Sial. The tribe from then onwards held the tract of land from their seat of power in Badh Rajbana, Shorkot up until the Kundal Khokhar, into the Muzaffargarh boundary and several villages in the Thal.

References 

Populated places in Jhang District
Jhang District
Tehsils of Punjab, Pakistan
Cities in Punjab (Pakistan)